This article features an extensive cast of characters from the Nickelodeon animated series The Fairly OddParents, created by Butch Hartman.

Main

Timmy Turner

Timothy Tiberius Turner is a 10-year-old boy who was given fairy godparents to grant his every wish as a result of his neglectful parents and abuse from Vicky. He wears a pink hat and shirt with blue pants. He also has a comically large malocclusion, which is usually mocked. His wishes often have unpredictable and problematic side effects, and are often reverted upon Timmy's request by the end of the episode. His interests include comic books, video games, cartoons, and sports. During a time travel trip, Timmy accidentally arrives the day his parents moved into their house; unseen, he learns that they were expecting a girl, hence his pink hat.

Originally, Timmy was going to be named Mike after Butch Hartman's older brother, but this led to an argument, so Hartman instead named the character after his youngest brother. Hartman also originally wanted to give him the last name Taylor, but that was close to Tim Allen's character name Tim Taylor in Home Improvement. Hartman has also stated that Timmy is his alter ego: "He's a wise guy. He's sarcastic. He's quick-tempered... He loves comic books. He loves video games. ... He's pretty much my alter ego, except I didn't have fairy godparents."

Timmy is voiced by Mary Kay Bergman in the original  Oh Yeah! Cartoons shorts, and by Tara Strong in the main television series and related media. In the live-action films, he is portrayed by Drake Bell, but the animated portion in A Fairly Odd Summer is voiced by Strong. Alec Baldwin guest voiced adult Timmy in the "Channel Chasers" television special. In The Fairly OddParents: Fairly Odder, he is played by Caleb Pierce.

Cosmo and Wanda
Cosmo and Wanda are fairy godparents assigned to grant Timmy's, and later Chloe's, wishes. They were previously the godparents of Denzel Crocker, Billy Gates, Tina Turner, and other historical and modern day figures; such as Benjamin Franklin. To avoid being seen by humans other than Timmy, they often disguise themselves as animals or inanimate objects.

Cosmo
Cosmo Julius Fairywinkle-Cosma is Wanda's husband, Poof's father, and Timmy and Chloe's godfather. He is known for his dim-witted personality and has been responsible for inadvertently causing disasters since he was born. As explained in "Fairly Oddbaby", Cosmo's ability for destruction is such that when he was born, all fairies were henceforth no longer allowed to have children out of the fear that another potential fairy baby would be as bad as or worse than Cosmo. Although he is very laid back and dim, Cosmo is prone to fits of jealousy and becomes defensive when he sees others flirting with Wanda. He was the youngest fairy until Poof was born and, though he was considered an only child in earlier episodes, has a brother named Schnozmo that debuts later. His mother, Mama Cosma, is overprotective of Cosmo and thus despises Wanda. Cosmo has green hair and typically wears a white shirt, black pants, and a black necktie. He has shown to love pudding and a nickel named Philipp.

Cosmo is voiced by Daran Norris in the original Oh Yeah! Cartoons shorts, the main TV series and related media, including the 2022 live-action revival/reboot series Fairly Odder. In the live-action film A Fairly Odd Movie: Grow Up, Timmy Turner, the live-action Cosmo is portrayed by Jason Alexander, but the animated portions are still voiced by Norris.

Wanda
Wanda Venus Fairywinkle-Cosma is Cosmo's wife, Poof's mother, and Timmy and Chloe's godmother. She is depicted as being smart and caring. Unlike Cosmo, she tries to prevent Timmy from wishing for things which can be disastrous, though her attempts often fail. However, she is responsible for the extinction of dinosaurs, 65 million years ago. She has a sister, who is a popular actress, named Blonda whom she fights with a lot, as Wanda believes her sister's life as a Soap Star is easier than hers as a housewife. Wanda also has a father named Big Daddy, who also despised Cosmo similar to how Mama Cosma dislikes Wanda but to a much lesser extent. She has pink hair styled with a swirl in front and is usually shown wearing a yellow T-shirt and black pants. Wanda has an obsession with chocolate, and it is one of the only things that can distract her from her top priorities.

Wanda's design, especially the hair swirl, is based on Wilma from The Flintstones. In the original pitch for the show she was named Venus and had blue hair.

Wanda is voiced by Susanne Blakeslee in the original Oh Yeah! Cartoons shorts, the main TV series and related media, including the 2022 live-action revival/reboot series Fairly Odder. In the live-action film A Fairly Odd Movie: Grow Up, Timmy Turner, the live-action Wanda is portrayed by Cheryl Hines, but the animated portions are still voiced by Blakeslee.

Vicky 

Vicky is Timmy's rude, selfish, greedy, sadistic, conniving, malicious, and tyrannical 16-year-old babysitter, and one of the main antagonists in the series. She has but a few friends and enjoys torturing children, watching television and making the world miserable, especially for Timmy. She lives with her mother, her father, and her younger sister Tootie. She has encountered Cosmo and Wanda on numerous occasions, but does not believe in them.

Also, she has encountered Mark Chang in his natural form, which she dismisses in early seasons as a Halloween costume, but recognizes as his true form during Season 6. A plot point in the episode "Frenemy Mine" involved her belonging to a dark society known as B.R.A.T. (Babysitters Raging Against Twerps). She has been shown to be accepting of her own cruelty, and that the only reason she is, is that she was mistreated as a child by her own babysitter.

Vicky is voiced by Grey (DeLisle) Griffin in the original  Oh Yeah! Cartoons shorts, the main television series and related media. In the live-action films, she is portrayed by Devon Weigel. Vicky also appears as a recurring antagonist in The Fairly OddParents: Fairly Odder, where she is now a teacher at Dimmsdale Junior High, being portrayed by Mary Kate Wiles.

Mr. Crocker

Mr. Denzel Quincy Crocker, usually called Mr. Crocker, is a grayish-skinned, hunchbacked man and Timmy's fairy-obsessed teacher, and one of the main antagonists in the series. He correctly suspects that Timmy has fairy godparents of his own, and he is often able to tell what Timmy has wished for by the smallest, most irrelevant clues. His unshakable belief in fairy godparents leads to other adults perceiving him as mentally ill. A running gag has him spasm uncontrollably whenever he shouts, "Fairy godparents!".
 
Crocker has been shown to go to great extents to prove his theory that Timmy has fairy godparents, sinking vast quantities of money into expensive equipment and conducting elaborate experiments. He is also willing to do highly dangerous and immoral things to confirm the belief. For example, in his debut episode, "Transparents!", he attempts to test whether Cosmo and Wanda are fairies by trying to get them to sit in an electric chair. He states that, "If they survive, they're fairies!" but "If they don't, I have tenure!"
 
Surprisingly, Crocker is the previous godchild of Cosmo and Wanda. Though he lost them and the memories of their time with him, his belief in fairies remains. Timmy tries to alter this event via time travel in "The Secret Origin of Denzel Crocker!", but he paradoxically fails and becomes the reason Crocker lost Cosmo and Wanda and made him remember his belief in fairies.
 
Although being a middle-aged man, he still lives with his mother, Dolores Crocker. His father has never been seen or mentioned in the series.
 
In an ironic twist, Crocker served for many decades as the main power source for fairy magic; his belief is so strong that it was used to power the Big Wand, the source of all the magic in Fairy World. In the episode, "Crocker Shocker", this leads to the Big Wand losing all its power after he is hypnotized into believing fairies do not exist. To remedy this, Timmy, Cosmo, Wanda, Poof, and Jorgen make it so that everyone as equally crazy about fairies as Crocker is used as a source of power for the Big Wand.

Crocker is based on Eugene Levy's character in the 1984 film Splash. He was also designed to be in another cartoon that Hartman was pitching, but was placed in the show as the latter needed more villains.

Crocker is voiced by Carlos Alazraqui in the main television series and related media. In the live-action films, he is portrayed by David Lewis; he does not have an animated version of himself. Crocker returns in The Fairly OddParents: Fairly Odder, reprised by Alazraqui in both animation and live-action.

Poof
Poof Fairywinkle-Cosma is Cosmo and Wanda's son, introduced into the series in the 2008 special Fairly OddBaby. He was the first fairy baby born in over ten thousand years, with his own father being the second to last. His magical abilities are controlled by his emotions and channeled through his magic rattle.

In "Fairy Old Parent", Poof is assigned to his very first person as a fairy godparent as his own, for miserable old people; such as Mrs. Crocker. He grants her wishes but became overworked and exhausted, returning to Cosmo and Wanda.

In the Season 10 episode "Certifiable Super Sitter", Poof returned from Spellementary Boarding School for spring break. His voice has gotten deeper and more comical as part of his formal training to be a great fairy. Chloe goes completely crazy over him, as she loves babies. Due to avoiding difficulty by not having plots with too many main characters in each episode, Poof only appeared in one episode of Season 10.

Poof was originally going to be named Dusty.

Poof's baby vocalizations are done by Tara Strong in the main television series and related media. In the film A Fairly Odd Movie: Grow Up, Timmy Turner!, Poof's speaking voice is done by Randy Jackson, but the baby vocalizations are still done by Strong.

Sparky
Sparky is Timmy's talking fairy dog, who was a character in Season 9, but was dropped from the show before Season 10 due to negative reception. Sparky has orange fur, a wand for a tail, a blue nose, and fairy wings. He wears a fairy crown and a blue collar. Sparky's magic tail doesn't work when he is wet. He has magic fleas that will turn people into dogs if bitten. He is highly allergic to pasta, and is capable of performing human acts, such as driving. Unlike Timmy's fairy godparents, it is okay for other people to know about Sparky, but they cannot know that he can talk.

Sparky is voiced by Matthew W. Taylor in the main television series and related media.

Chloe Carmichael
Chloe Carmichael is Timmy's neighbor who debuts in the Season 10 premiere episode, "The Big Fairy Share Scare". Due to there not being enough fairies available for kids, overwhelming demand and fairies taking on better paying jobs in the fancy candle industry, she and Timmy are forced to share Cosmo and Wanda. Although in the beginning they do not get along, they end up becoming best friends. Chloe is seen by Timmy as an annoying, goody goody, and boastful, little girl and she has the tendency to cause chaos with her wishes.

Chloe is voiced by Kari Wahlgren in the main television series and related media.

Supporting

Timmy's parents
Mr. Turner, also known as "Dad", (voiced and portrayed by Daran Norris in the series and the live-action films respectively) and Mrs. Turner, also known as "Mom", (voiced by Susanne Blakeslee, portrayed by Teryl Rothery in the live-action films) are Timmy's parents. Mom is a real estate agent and home dealer; and Dad works as an employee of a pencil factory called Pencil Nexus and troop leader for Timmy's Squirrelly Scouts Troop, though both have had several other jobs, usually only for a single episode. When either of them mentions their first names, they're usually cut off or silenced in a comedic fashion, and were even referred to as "Mom" and "Dad" as children. Mom is shown to be a horrible gardener and cook, as anything she tries to grow dies and her meals usually come alive and try to attack her family.  Dad is often shown hating the Dinklebergs, the next door neighbors, which can be compared to Homer Simpson's hatred for Ned Flanders in The Simpsons.  Both are completely oblivious to the magic in their home, and despite their love for Timmy, tend to be somewhat neglectful. They leave Timmy with Vicky, his babysitter, and are oblivious to signs that she is evil; even going as far as believing that the song "Icky Vicky" was about pumpkins. Mr. Dinkleberg and Mrs. Turner used to be a couple during their teenage years.
 Hartman originally designed Timmy's parents to only appear from the waist down in Oh Yeah! Cartoons.

Kids 
Chester McBadbat (voiced by Frankie Muniz 2001–2003; Jason Marsden 2003–2017) is one of Timmy's best friends. He lives in a trailer with his father in an impoverished community with few amenities. He is generous and cares more for others than himself, as every time he has obtained magic, he has used his wishes to try to improve the lives of others, even though it usually leads to disaster. He becomes the only classmate of Timmy to know about his godparents' existence in "Fairy Idol", but it is not mentioned again in later episodes. He often wears worn-in, oversized clothes. He has freckles, green eyes, dental braces, and blonde shaggy hair and eyebrows. As shown in the episode "Emotion Commotion!", he seems to be allergic to girls. Chris Anderson portrays him in A Fairly Odd Movie: Grow Up, Timmy Turner!.
A.J. (voiced by Ibrahim Haneef Muhammad 2001–2003; Gary LeRoi Gray 2003–2017) is the resident genius in Timmy's class, and one of his best friends. He comes from an upper-middle-class family, and is a straight "A" student in school, a quality both his parents have achieved as well. He has constructed an older brother who defends him from bullies, fulfilling his need for a real one. He plays with video games and reads comic books like his other friends, in spite of his superior intellect. He has a secret laboratory that he conceals with a "cloak" button on his bedroom wall which, when pressed, converts his lab into a typical bedroom. Jesse Reid portrays him in A Fairly Odd Movie: Grow Up, Timmy Turner!.
 (voiced by Grey DeLisle in the TV series, Amber Hood in the Oh Yeah! Cartoons episode "The Fairy Flu", portrayed in the live-action movies by Daniella Monet) is Vicky's younger sister. She is a bespectacled girl who has an obsessive crush on Timmy, often going to the extreme of spying on and stalking him. While Timmy rejects her regularly, he does have a soft spot for her and does nice things for her in several episodes, including sending Cosmo and Wanda out on loan for her birthday after Vicky ruins it. When Vicky isn't torturing the children she babysits, she regularly tortures Tootie at home in substitution. The name originates from Hartman's nickname for his daughter Carly.
Elmer (voiced by Dee Bradley Baker, named for Butch Hartman's real name) is a nerdy kid and one of Timmy's friends. His most notable feature is the abnormally large boil on his face whom he named Bob (after series animator Bob Boyle). Unbeknownst to the rest of the world, Bob is sentient and evil. Elmer is the only one who can hear Bob speak and tries to keep his boil in check.
Sanjay (voiced by Dee Bradley Baker) is a boy of Indian-American descent who is one of Timmy's friends. He speaks with a high pitched voice, which is accompanied by a strong accent. He often has to put up with his stepfather's military ways of life as if he were in boot camp. He also has a dream about Timmy and his white horse saving him.
 (voiced by Dionne Quan) is the object of Timmy's affection and the most popular girl at Dimmsdale Elementary. Due to Timmy not being popular, Trixie rarely acknowledges his existence, except in secret. It is revealed that she likes action comic books, but keeps it a secret to maintain her popularity. At the end of "Channel Chasers", Timmy's future children have physical similarities to both Trixie and Tootie.
Veronica (voiced by Grey DeLisle) is Trixie Tang's obsessive best friend who wants to be Trixie. She may also have a secret crush on Timmy.
Tad and Chad (voiced by Tara Strong and Grey DeLisle) are two of Timmy's wealthy, popular classmates. They often make fun of Timmy and other unpopular kids, and also frequently turn Trixie away from Timmy by embarrassing him or impressing her with their money.
Kevin Crocker (voiced by Carlos Alazraqui) is the nephew of Mr. Crocker, being the son of his half-sister. He is physically identical to his uncle. Kevin debuts in "Chip off the Old Crock!", where his uncle tries to instruct him to follow in his footsteps to hunt fairies, but instead, he ends up befriending Chloe and Timmy. After it, he appears as a recurring character during the season 10.

Fairies 
 (voiced by Daran Norris, played by Mark Gibbon in the live-action movies) is the anti-hero of the show who appears to be the toughest fairy in the universe who speaks with an Austrian accent (a clear reference to Arnold Schwarzenegger) and is a high-ranking official in Fairy World. Unlike other fairies who "poof" from place to place, Jorgen appears and disappears in the form of an atomic explosion and has a jet pack instead of wings. In "The Zappies", he mentioned he has had only one godchild, Winston; the reason for this, as revealed in "Temporary Fairy", is that his extreme wish-granting and daredevil stunts unnecessarily endanger the lives of godchildren. He is sadistic and enjoys the idea of others cowering in fear of him, which affects his ability to have friends besides Cosmo and Wanda. Although Jorgen is known as the toughest fairy in Fairy World, he is seen multiple times crying in front of Cosmo and Wanda. In 'Teeth for Two', it is revealed that he dated the Tooth Fairy before breaking up over Timmy's teeth. He married her at the end of the episode, but the marriage was not mentioned since. It is revealed in "Cosmo Rules" that Cosmo is his distant cousin.
 (voiced by Dee Baker) is a meek yet optimistic fairy whom Jorgen often abuses and berates.
 (voiced by Carlos Alazraqui) is Remy Buxaplenty's fairy godparent who speaks with an overexaggerated Spanish accent. He is often a villain in the episodes in which he appears alongside his godchild, but is actually a kind fairy whom Timmy considers a friend. He is Wanda's ex-boyfriend and is still infatuated with her, much to Cosmo's chagrin. A running gag has him magically tearing off his white T-shirt to show off his muscles and then making it reappear shortly thereafter.
Cupid (voiced by Tom Kenny) is a fairy who promotes love across the universe, yet his arrogance contrasts his love-themed abilities.
The Tooth Fairy (voiced by Grey DeLisle) is one of the few adult-sized fairies, which is dedicated to changing the teeth that children leave under the pillows for coins, and the wife of Jorgen Von Strangle.
Mama Cosma (voiced by Jane Carr) is Cosmo and Schnozmo's mother. She loathes Wanda and repeatedly attempts to get rid of her because of the over-protective bond she has with her son.
Blonda Fairywinkle (voiced by Julia Louis-Dreyfus in her first appearance and Tara Strong in all subsequent appearances) is the twin sister of Wanda. She is far more self-centered and vain compared to Wanda. She is the star of the soap opera "All My Biceps" which is Jorgen's favorite show. In "Fairy Idol", she is seen to be in love with Juandissimo.
Dr. Rip Studwell (voiced by Jim Ward in the first appearance, Butch Hartman in later appearances) is a fairy doctor who insists on being referred to by his full name and usually plays golf and spends time with ladies rather than performing medical procedures.
Big Daddy Fairywinkle (voiced by Tony Sirico) is the father of Wanda and Blonda and the husband of Mama Cosma. He is the boss of a mafia that has even scared Jorgen before and also has a business that is responsible for cleaning up all of the garbage in Fairy World.
Santa Claus (voiced by Tom Arnold in his normal form and Kevin Michael Richardson in his other form, played by Donavon Stinson in A Fairly Odd Christmas) is the figure of holiday folklore. Outside of Christmas time he is a thin businessman that wears a suit and has neatly trimmed hair. Near Christmas, he is lent magic by all the fairies of the world which transforms him into the most commonly recognized form.
Baby New Year is the figure of holiday folklore. He is a giant baby that only speaks with a giant "goo" and always carries a rattle.
The Easter Bunny (voiced by Robert Costanzo) is the figure of holiday folklore. He talks with a Brooklyn mob accent.
The April Fool (voiced by Daran Norris) is the "embodiment of comedy" who is Fairy World's chief comedian and tells jokes very frequently at Uncle Knuckle's Chuckle Bunker. His voice and mannerisms are similar to Jerry Seinfeld.

Superheroes 
  (voiced by Jay Leno, Daran Norris in episodes "Super Humor" and "Fairy Fairy Quite Contrary") is a comic book superhero whose comics Timmy and many other children in the series enjoy reading. Though he has many standard superhero abilities such as flight, superior strength, and heat vision, his main weapon is his enormous chin: a reference to that of his voice actor, which he gained when a radioactive actor bit him on the chin. Sometimes, Timmy joins him in his comic book adventures as his sidekick "Cleft the Boy Chin Wonder," and at other times, the Chin comes to the real world via fairy magic. He lives in "Chincinnati", and his alter ego is Charles Hampton "Chuck" Indigo, news writer for the Daily Blabbity. 
 (voiced by Adam West in Season 4–6, Jeff Bennett in Season 9-10) is actor Adam West's alter ego, and a good friend of Timmy's. He is considered insane by most people since he thinks he is part cat because of a TV show he was part of 30 years ago. The character is a reference to West's role as Batman on the 1960s television show.
 (Sprig Speevak) (voiced by Daran Norris, James Arnold Taylor in the "Crash Nebula" special) is a fictional space hero whose television show is watched by Timmy and his friends.

Dimmsdale Elementary School staff 
 (voiced by Grey DeLisle) is the Irish-accented principal at Dimmsdale Elementary School and was once in love with Denzel Crocker, but broke up with him when she realized about his obsession with fairies. She has a full-figured physique, and loves any kind of food, especially jelly donuts, but is unable to eat cake because, as she states, she's "frosting intolerant".
Mr. Bickles (voiced by Jim Ward) is Timmy's flamboyant drama teacher. A running gag is that he always has a "new dream" that is later "ruined", usually as the result of something Timmy has done.
Mr. Birkenbake (voiced by Rob Paulsen) is another teacher at Timmy's school and the chief editor of the school newspaper. He is a hippie that lives in a trailer and collects items made of "smoof" which he calls "the greatest natural occurring substance in the world". His name is a reference to Birkenstock sandals which are commonly associated with hippies.

Other 
 (voiced by Rob Paulsen) is an alien prince from the planet of Yugopotamia (located almost 10,760 astronomical units away from Earth) and one of Timmy's friends. Chang resembles a green squid-like creature with a brain contained in glass. He also features a "Fake-i-fier" on his waist, allowing him to shapeshift into objects and human forms. Introduced in "Spaced Out", Chang and the other aliens of Yugopotamia are horrified by things commonly considered cute and are attracted to disgusting objects (like manure) and people. As such, Chang has a crush on Vicky, who is unaware that he is a real alien. His parents, King Gripullon and Queen Jipjorrulac (voiced by Paulsen and Laraine Newman, respectively) eventually marry Chang to the vicious, homicidal Princess Mandie (pronounced "Man-DIE"). To escape her wrath, Chang relocates to the Dimmsdale Dump on Earth. He also celebrates F.L.A.R.G., a holiday celebrating revolting activities before blowing up the host's planet. Hartman said that he was supposed to have an evil alien voice, but when Paulsen used a surfer dude voice instead, they went with that.
 The  (voiced by Carlos Alazraqui, portrayed by Serge Houde in the first live action film) is the city's unnamed mayor for life who was first introduced in "Dream Goat!", where he is very protective (and somewhat jealous) of the city's famous mascot, Chompy the Goat (also voiced by Alazraqui), who in later episodes seems to become a very good friend of the Mayor, and is sometimes a literal "scapegoat" for when the Mayor needs to blame something on someone.
 The  are the Turners' next-door neighbors. Mr. Turner believes Sheldon Dinkleberg (voiced by Carlos Alazraqui) to be his nemesis and blames him for numerous misfortunes. Nevertheless, Sheldon is a well-meaning and friendly neighbor and puts up with Mr. Turner's hatred of him, and he even humors the theories Mr. Turner makes about himself. He and his wife, Mrs. Dinkleberg, (voiced by Susanne Blakeslee) do not have any children and so can afford many luxuries that the Turners cannot. Sheldon having been in a relationship with Mrs. Turner only increased Mr. Tunrner's obsessive feelings of hatred towards him.
Bucky McBadbat (voiced by Rob Paulsen) is Chester's father and former baseball player who was kicked out of the MLB for being, per Timmy's words, "the worst baseball player ever". He wears a paper bag on his head because of the shame of being a failure as a baseball player.
Mrs. Dolores Crocker (voiced by Carlos Alazraqui) is Mr. Crocker's mother, who lives with her son. Mr. Crocker does not support her.
 (voiced by Jim Ward) is a vertically challenged newscaster, known for his trademark line "I'm Chet Ubetcha".
 (voiced by Chris Kirkpatrick) is a widely popular and attractive teen singing sensation, and friend of Timmy Turner's. Timmy initially wishes that the worst possible non-lethal thing would happen to Chip, which turned out to be being stuck with Vicky. This inspired him to write the hit song "Icky Vicky". 
 (voiced by Tara Strong) is a widely popular and attractive female teen singing sensation, and the princess of pop in Dimmsdale. She was sent by Cosmo to Fairy World in the episode "Truth or Cosmoquences" after she was hypnotized to believe she was his wife. She is a parody of Britney Spears. Her major role time mainly occurred during the series' original run until her only appearance in "Momnipresent" in the revival before being written out from the show due to Spears' negative reputation since 2006.
Flappy Bob (voiced by S. Scott Bullock) is a clown that was separated from his parents as a baby and raised by the Pixies to be a boring businessman. He was the founder and original owner of Flappy Bob's Camp Learn-A-Torium.
Happy Peppy Gary and Happy Peppy Betty (voiced respectively by Rob Paulsen and Grey DeLisle) are two of the workers at Flappy Bob's Camp Learn-A-Torium who are very overprotective of the children in their care. Gary has a crush on Betty but she doesn't see him that way.
Doug Dimmadome (voiced by Jim Ward) is the owner of the Dimmsdale Dimmadome and several other buildings and companies in Dimmsdale, and the richest and most powerful man in the city. Based on his mannerisms and Western attire, he is most likely a parody of American businessman William Randolph Hearst.
King Gripullon and Queen Jipjorrulac (voiced respectively by Rob Paulsen and Laraine Newman) are Mark Chang's parents, and rulers of Yugopotamia.
Mr. Ed Leadly (voiced by Rob Paulsen, portrayed by Tony Alcantar in A Fairly Odd Summer) is the president and CEO of Pencil Nexus, and boss of Timmy's Dad. His design resembles a small #2 pencil.
Clark and Connie Carmichael (voiced respectively by Mick Wingert and Cheri Oteri) are Chloe's parents. He is a "Professional Hero", and she is an "Extreme Veterinarian".

Villains

Francis
Francis (voiced by Faith Abrahams) is the school bully and another of Timmy's enemies. He has gray skin and a low-pitched voice, and his clothes and underwear are ragged. In "It's a Wishful Life", it is revealed that, if Timmy did not exist, Francis would funnel all of the aggression he expends bullying into football. His final appearance was in season 7. He was not seen in season 8, 9 or 10.

Anti-Fairies
The Anti-Fairies, as their name suggests, are the evil opposite of fairies. The anti-fairies are responsible for all the bad luck on earth and, according to Cosmo, Friday the 13th is their "Christmas". Each fairy has an anti-fairy counterpart, who is their opposite in both personality and morality.

Anti-Cosmo (Daran Norris) is portrayed as a cynical, evil, sadistic, and intelligent anti-fairy with a British accent, and is hinted to be the leader of the Anti-Fairies, while Anti-Wanda (Susanne Blakeslee), is portrayed as a dumb, hillbilly fairy who eats with her feet.

The Anti-Fairies reside in Anti-Fairy World, an enclosed environment within Fairy World, first shown as a chamber with a gate guarded by Jorgen. After Timmy accidentally set them free on Earth, Anti-Fairy World was turned into a prison-styled containment facility, where residents live in cells and wear suits preventing them from using magic. The high levels of security were still deemed penetrable, due in part to a specific group effort to get Anti-Cosmo out of Anti-Fairy World to be used as a donor for an operation. The Anti-Fairies serve as the main villains of The Jimmy Timmy Power Hour 2: When Nerds Collide, Fairly OddBaby, and Fairy Oddlympics. They are fairly important villains early in the series, but have made few appearances after Poof is introduced.

Anti Sparky is the evil version of Sparky who appeared in the episode "Man's Worst Friend". Unlike Sparky who is stupid yet very loyal and friendly, Anti Sparky is smart and takes advice from nobody.

Foop

Foop (voiced by Eric Bauza, portrayed by Scott Baio in A Fairly Odd Summer) is the evil counterpart of Poof and the son of Anti-Cosmo and Anti-Wanda. Because Poof is so nice and attracts so much positive attention, Foop is portrayed as evil and extremely jealous of his counterpart. Foop wants nothing but to destroy Poof, and he cares not for anyone who gets in his way. Unlike Poof, who causes bad things to happen when he cries, Foop's cry causes good things to happen.

Foop resembles Poof, but he is shaped like a cube rather than a ball. He also has a black mustache and goatee (a reference to the Star Trek episode "Mirror, Mirror" in which the evil counterpart of Spock wears the same). Foop has bat wings and a black crown, and his wand is a baby bottle with bat wings on the side. He also speaks with a stereotypical British gentleman accent.

Pixies
Pixies are similar to fairies but have a much more corporate attitude toward magic than fairies do. As such, they have square physical features, utilize mobile phones instead of wands, dress in predominantly greyscale suits with cone-shaped hats, speak in a monotone drone (provided by Ben Stein), require that wishes be submitted for approval by filling out multiple forms, and have a general disregard for anything fun or exciting that does not fit into the pixie mentality. Not only that, but they refer to their home world as a business called Pixies, Inc., and their leader is referred to as the Head Pixie, or H.P. (a caricature of Stein himself), with a pixie called Sanderson being his second-in-command. When they warp from place to place, Pixies use "ping" clouds instead of the fairies' traditional "poof" clouds. On numerous occasions, they have attempted to take over Fairy World and replace all fairies with pixies using elaborate business schemes.

Dr. Bender
Dr. Bender (voiced by Gilbert Gottfried in "The Same Game", "Scary GodParents", and "Shiny Teeth"; Butch Hartman onwards) is an evil dentist. He has an obsession with perfect teeth, wears dentures that keep his mouth in a perpetual smile, and is intolerant toward anyone who does not have quality teeth. His son, Wendell (also voiced by Gilbert Gottfried and later Butch Hartman), is almost identical to his father in appearance and is also tooth-hygienic, but hates it when his father scares off other kids. Dr. Bender enjoys performing pointless procedures on children's teeth and encourages children to eat refined sugar to boost his business.

Dark Laser
Dark Laser (voiced by Kevin Michael Richardson) is a science fiction villain character who is first seen as an image of a catalog toy before Timmy brings him to life in "Hard Copy". In "Escape from Unwish Island," Dark Laser is among the Unwished characters that work for Imaginary Gary. He becomes a recurring villain in season six, appearing in "Mission: Responsible", "The End of Universe-ity", "Dread 'n' Breakfast", "Please Don't Feed The Turners" and "Momnipresent". He is an obvious parody of Darth Vader from the Star Wars film series. He is often seen carrying his mechanical toy dog Flipsy, whom Timmy brings into the real world before him (although not alive) and whose backflipping function always makes him giggle.

Norm the Genie
Norm (voiced by Norm Macdonald in the series and by Robert Cait in "Fairy Idol") is a genie tired of being bound to his lava lamp, into which he must return after being released and granting three wishes to his releaser. While there are no rules as to what wishes he can grant, he is deceptive and can find clever ways to subvert his master's expectations. After Timmy outsmarts him in his first appearance, he colludes with Crocker in his second appearance to get revenge on Timmy. In the special episode "Fairy Idol", he formulates a scheme to become a fairy godparent so he can escape his lamp and sabotages a "Fairy Idol" contest (parodying American Idol) to reach this goal.

Princess Mandie
Princess Mandie a.k.a. Man-DIE (voiced by Tara Strong) is Mark Chang's terrifying though beautiful former fiancée, a barbaric extraterrestrial princess who can be described as psychotically violent. Antagonized by Mark's intimidation about her and his refusal to marry her, Mandie constantly plots revengeful, bloodthirsty murder against him. It was later revealed Mandie never loved Mark and only wanted to marry him as a way of seizing power. Mandie was eventually defeated by Vicky when Timmy and Mark tricked Vicky into attacking her.

Remy Buxaplenty
Remy Buxaplenty (voiced by Dee Bradley Baker) is an archetypical privileged wealthy child, and one of Timmy's rivals. Despite being very rich, Remy is usually unhappy due to his neglectful, wealth-distracted parents, which is the reason why he has a fairy godparent, Wanda's ex-boyfriend Juandissimo. Both Remy and Timmy are aware of each other's fairy godparents, and Remy continuously tries to remove Timmy's fairies, primarily out of jealousy of not having both fairy and human parents who love him. Other than Timmy, and later, Chloe, he is the only named child in the series with a fairy godparent, though many episodes have featured a cameo of at least one unnamed child with their fairy godparent. His last name is a pun of "Bucks aplenty."

The Crimson Chin Villains
The enemies of the Crimson Chin that threaten Chincinnati.

The Bronze Kneecap (voiced by Dee Bradley Baker) is the archenemy of the Crimson Chin and the founder of the Body of Evil. His origin story is explained in the episode "The Masked Magician": he was born Ron Hambone, a jai alai player famous for his numerous third-place wins. At one point, he was about to claim a first-place win for the first time, only to trip over the Crimson Chin's eponymous chin and break one of his knees. This led him to melt his trophies into a bronze cast suit of armor, inspiring his villain name. His particular ability involves shooting various weapons out of the kneecap pieces of his suit. He once tried to have his enemy pulverised by strapping him to a giant mechanical leg and have a giant doctor robot test the leg's reflex while simultaneously smashing the Chin, later revealed as part of a plan to destroy the City Hall via the leg's reflex kicking a giant soccer ball towards it.
The Nega Chin (voiced by Jay Leno) is the evil twin of the Crimson Chin, who possesses the same powers. He wears a dark gray costume instead of red, has pointed teeth and red eyes, and has a no symbol over the C logo on his chin.
H2Olga (voiced by Susanne Blakeslee) is a water-based villain in the Crimson Chin comics, who becomes more powerful when she absorbs more water. She speaks with a Russian accent.
The Gilded Arches (voiced by Rob Paulsen) is a former child film actor who crushes theaters with his gigantic, golden legs and feet, his only body parts that grew during puberty. He is very fond of disco and has a golden tooth. He appears in both the Crimson Chin webcomics, in which he tried to destroy any and all theaters that no longer showed his films (including the Someguy Asian-American Theater due to them never allowing Arches to put his feet in their cement) and the video game Breakin' da Rules, in which he steals the Chin's speed.
The Titanium Toenail is a villain in the Crimson Chin comics. He has the ability to shoot from his helmet sharp projectiles shaped like toenail clippings, which can cut through metal.
The Iron Lung is a metal-based villain in the Crimson Chin comics. He is a robotic enemy that uses the power of wind, which he uses to blow heavy gusts at his enemies as well as vacuum anything in his path.
The Golden Gut is a villain in the Crimson Chin comics. His stomach is made of weighted metal, which extends from his body and rams into his adversaries.
The Copper Cranium is a villain in the Crimson Chin comics, who wears a helmet with a giant, spring-loaded extra skull that can punch through obstacles.
Brass Knuckles (voiced by Dee Bradley Baker) a.k.a. Coslo Puncholowski, is a hand-to-hand combat villain who has attempted to defeat the Crimson Chin in battle. As his name indicates, he has thick brass knuckles which enable him to punch through walls.
Spatula Woman (voiced by Grey DeLisle) is a woman who uses a giant red spatula to squish her enemies. She made her first appearance in the segment "Chin Up!", where she first encounters Cleft. She returned in the video game Breakin' Da Rules as the villain who stole the Crimson Chin's charisma.
Short-Fuse is a short-statured, bomb-themed villain in the Crimson Chin comics. As his name suggests, he is distinguished by his short temper, which lights the fuse on the hat he wears; and he literally explodes when others call him "small", "short" and "tiny".
Country Boy is a villain in the Crimson Chin comics. He throws deadly pig grenades.

The Darkness
The Darkness (voiced by Dee Bradley Baker) is an ancient entity that has existed for millennia and the main antagonist in the first two thirds of the "Wishology" trilogy. It was first encountered by the Ancient Fairy Warriors. Only when the fairies combined their powers to neutralize the Darkness by using its natural enemy, light, did they manage to stop the Darkness completely. In "Wishology", the Darkness returns, seeking out the Chosen One prophesied to stop it: Turbo Thunder, a superhero who resembles Timmy. In "Wishology 3: The Final Ending", the Darkness' true intentions are revealed: it only wants to alleviate its lonely existence by making friends, but it frightens everyone on almost every planet it visits. Together, Timmy, Turbo Thunder, and their friends transform the Darkness into a light being called "The Kindness".

The Eliminators
The Eliminators are robots that serve as The Darkness's henchmen. They are a parody of the iconic action film character the Terminator. They have the power to absorb any weapons and gain its fire power, and after acquiring Fake-a-fires from Yugopotamia, can change their appearance to match anyone or anything. Throughout the "Wishology" trilogy the main Eliminator, characterized by his leather jacket and sunglasses, becomes obsessed with eliminating Timmy after many failed attempts. In "Wishology 3: The Final Ending", he spits from the Darkness after it orders him to keep Timmy alive, and absorbs first Jorgen's wand, then an arsenal of weapons to become "The Destructinator". The Destructinator then uses his magic to transform the Earth into his own, mechanical, planet with the inhabitants his servants. The Destructinator orders for the planet to be filled with explosives that will be launched at The Darkness by a small detonator in an attempt to destroy it himself. After Timmy frees the Fairies from the Darkness, he engages The Destructinator in combat, only to be beaten, but Timmy then tricks The Destructinator into absorbing all the explosives from the planet, which Timmy then detonates, obliterating The Destructinator for good. At the end of the episode, The Darkness (now reformed as The Kindness) releases a new Eliminator (now a friendly "Hug-inator") to free everyone that was trapped inside it.

References

The Fairly OddParents
Fairly Oddparents The
Fairly OddParents, The
Fairly OddParents
Television characters introduced in 1998
Animated characters introduced in 1998
Television characters introduced in 2001
Animated characters introduced in 2001